WILO (1570 AM, 96.9 FM and 102.7 FM) is a radio station licensed to Frankfort, Indiana.  The station broadcasts a classic hits format, local news, sports, weather, and agricultural information.  WILO AM/FM also features a local, live talk show weekday mornings from 8:30 to 9:30.  WILO maintains Clinton County Daily News.com, Boone County Daily News.com and a LIVE video stream channel for community events at www.hoosierlandtv.com.  WILO AM/FM is owned by Kaspar Broadcasting Co., Inc.  WSHW Shine 99 is a sister station to WILO, also owned by Kaspar Broadcasting Co., Inc.

References

External links

Classic hits radio stations in the United States
ILO